Nick Kosir is an American meteorologist. He worked for WJZY Fox 46 in Charlotte, North Carolina. He is known for his dancing videos online, hitting 5 million followers on TikTok as of September 2022. Kosir signed on to join the Fox Weather channel which launched on October 25, 2021.

Education 
Kosir earned a bachelor of arts in communicational organization from University of Akron. He earned a certificate in broadcast meteorology from Mississippi State University.

Career 
Kosir worked as a reporter and part-time weather forecaster at WMFD-TV in Mansfield, Ohio and later became the weather director. In October 2008, he began working as a morning meteorologist on KBTV-TV in Beaumont, Texas. While there, he became known as "The Rapping Weatherman".  Kosir worked for three years at KMVT in Twin Falls, Idaho. For seven years he worked for WJZY Fox 46, where employees are encouraged to post on social media daily. Kosir began by making skits with his best friend Hans and eventually imitating Cam Newton.

Personal life 
Kosir lives in New York City with his wife and son.

References

External links

Living people
Year of birth missing (living people)
American television meteorologists
University of Akron alumni
Mississippi State University alumni